Freezing is a BBC comedy series starring Hugh Bonneville and Elizabeth McGovern about an otherwise successful couple in their forties who find themselves out of work.

Synopsis 
Matt (Bonneville) is a publisher who has recently lost his job and Elizabeth (McGovern) is an Oscar-nominated American actress who is having a hard time getting work since moving to live with Matt in London.

Freezing was originally a one-off comedy as part of BBC Four's Tight Spot season in February 2007, which then became the first episode of the series when it aired on BBC Two in February 2008.

Freezing is written by James Wood and directed by Simon Curtis.

Cast 
 Hugh Bonneville as Matt
 Elizabeth McGovern as Elizabeth
 Tom Hollander as Leon Blakely
 Ben Miles as Stephen Marshall
 Rebecca Gethings as Kim
 Tim McInnerny as Bamber Jones
 Ruth Wilson as Alison Fennel
 Tom Riley as Dave Beethoven

Trivia
 Elizabeth McGovern is herself an Oscar-nominated actress who moved to London to live with her husband, Simon Curtis.
 From 2010 to 2015, McGovern and Bonneville worked together again, co-starring in the successful period drama series Downton Abbey as Robert and Cora Crawley, the Earl and Countess of Grantham.

References

External links

British Comedy Guide
Freezing reviews from Tom Hollander Fan Site

BBC television sitcoms
2007 British television series debuts
2008 British television series endings
2000s British sitcoms
English-language television shows
Television shows set in London
Downton Abbey